Hege Storhaug  (born 21 May 1962) is a Norwegian political activist and author. Since the 1990s she has been known for her criticism of Islam and later anti-immigration activism. She formerly worked as a journalist, before she became involved in anti-immigration activism. She runs the small anti-Islam organization Human Rights Service with her partner, and holds the title information director within the organization. In 2015 she published the bestselling book Islam, den 11. landeplage, later translated to English as Islam: Europe Invaded. America Warned, which claimed that Islam is a "plague." Scholars and commentators have described her views as far-right and Islamophobic.

Formerly an active volleyball player, Storhaug is a certified athletic trainer with a degree from the Norwegian School of Sport Sciences, and has highlighted eating disorders among female athletes. She began playing on the Norway women's national volleyball team when she was sixteen years old.

Sports and early life
Storhaug was born in Arendal, and grew up on the island of Hisøya in the municipality of Hisøy. She was an active volleyball player in her youth, and won the Norwegian Championship as part of the team Hisøy IL when she was fourteen and sixteen years old. When she was sixteen years old, she made her debut on the junior national team, as well as the senior national team.

She started her education at the Norwegian School of Sport Sciences in 1984, and graduated as a certified athletic trainer in 1987. From 1986 to 1987 she studied health and sports biology, and wrote a paper based on her mapping of the extent of eating disorders among female athletes. It was the first such mapping in Norway, and it brought considerable attention, including being on the first page of newspaper Dagbladet. She spoke in the media about her own eating disorder as a young athlete, which led to major public debate about the problem in Norway. In the wake of this, she co-founded the Interest Group for Women with Eating Disorders, and functioned as the press and information director of the organisation from 1987 to 1990.

In 1990 Storhaug took part in a mock marriage with her then-girlfriend as a protest outside the Norwegian parliament building. She is today married.

Journalism
Storhaug worked as a journalist for the left-wing newspaper Klassekampen from 1989 to 1990. She completed a degree in journalism at the Norwegian School of Journalism in 1992, after which she worked as a freelance journalist. One of her earliest journalistic efforts, for Dagbladet in 1992, was the first report in Norway about the forced marriages of young Muslim women. Before working with the story she adhered to left-wing "anti-racist" beliefs, and was shocked by her findings. The report in turn led to the passing of a law banning forced marriages in Norway. For further research she lived in Pakistan for two years in the mid-1990s, and wrote a book about her experience titled Mashallah. En reise blant kvinner i Pakistan. As of 2015 she has visited Pakistan seventeen times, and has several of her closest friends there.

After the publication of her book Hellig tvang in 1998, Storhaug had a leading role in the production of two documentaries for Rikets tilstand and TV 2 that aired in October 1999 about forced marriages and honor killings in Norway, which had a major impact on Norwegian society. She thereafter conceived and researched a documentary which revealed that girls in Norway were being subjected to female genital mutilation and that imams in the country secretly supported this practice. The program, which aired on TV 2 in October 2000 caused a considerable outcry, not least because imams who condemned this practice in interviews were caught on hidden cameras openly expressing their approval and encouragement of the procedure. The documentary Norske jenter omskjæres, about female genital mutilation won a SKUP diploma in 2000 and the Gullruten award for best documentary in 2001. 

In 2002, Storhaug released a report that described nine likely honor killings that had taken place in Norway by 2001. She was involved in the Brennpunkt documentary Barnebruder – en ulykkelig historie for state broadcaster NRK the same year, which uncovered the importation of child brides into Norway.

Human Rights Service
In 2002 Storhaug co-founded and began as information director of the foundation Human Rights Service (HRS). She was later, in 2004 accused of having exerted undue pressure on the girls she had worked with for her documentaries. Among those who have praised Storhaug and HRS's work is Ayaan Hirsi Ali, who in the first article she published as a fellow of the American Enterprise Institute wrote that while most non-governmental organizations in Europe "are embarrassingly silent" on the struggle for human rights for Muslim women and girls, "there is one in Norway that pays attention, Human Rights Service, run by a brave, determined woman, Hege Storhaug."

Storhaug's 2006 book Men størst av alt er friheten (later But the Greatest of These Is Freedom), was praised by some critics and won the Southern Norway's Literary Prize. However, only a total of 929 votes were cast, and there were five books nominated for the prize. A high-profile participant in media debates about forced marriage, honor killing, genital mutilation, Islam, and questions relating to the cultural impact and economic sustainability of large-scale immigration, her research and outspokenness led her to become increasingly more controversial.

In 2007 Storhaug was assaulted outside her own home and beaten bloody and unconscious with blows to the head by an unknown assailant. She did not go public with the story until 2010, initially wanting to keep it private and fearing it could scare likeminded activists, until changing her mind after an attack against Danish cartoonist Kurt Westergaard.

Her book Islam, den 11. landeplage (later Islam: Europe Invaded. America Warned) became one of Norway's biggest bestsellers during the autumn of 2015, selling 20,000 copies in its first month with several new editions issued, despite being self-published and gaining little to none initial mainstream media coverage. The same year she led online voting for the "Name of the Year" award of newspaper Verdens Gang by a wide margin, but fell short of winning the award following a final selective opinion poll. Some including Gunnar Stavrum and Kjetil Rolness criticised the selection process of the newspaper, particularly that the final results were not publicly disclosed and a less favourable presentation of Storhaug in the poll. By February 2016 the book had sold nearly 50,000 copies in Norway.

Social anthropologist Sindre Bangstad has described Storhaug as a leading Islamophobic and far-right voice in Norway. Anti-racist activist Tor Bach has accused Storhaug of promoting conspiracy theories against Muslims. Although Storhaug has officially distanced herself from the Eurabia theory since 2011, her 2015 book has been seen to use "any number of far-right and counter-jihadist sources", including Eurabia author Bat Ye'or, while her use of an underlying notion of a conspiracy with "liberal elites" is "of course a variant of the 'Eurabia' thesis".

Published books
 1990: Når følelser blir mat. Kvinner og spiseforstyrrelser (with Karin Christensen). Aschehoug. 
 1996: Mashallah. En reise blant kvinner i Pakistan. Aschehoug. 
 1998: Hellig tvang. Unge norske muslimer om kjærlighet og ekteskap. Aschehoug. 
 2003: Feminin integrering. Utfordringer i et fleretnisk samfunn. Kolofon. 
 2003: Human Visas: A Report from the Front Lines of Europe’s Integration Crisis (English translation by Bruce Bawer). Kolofon. 
 2006: Men størst av alt er friheten. Om innvandringens konsekvenser. Kagge. 
 2011: But the Greatest of These is Freedom: The Consequences of Immigration in Europe (revised and updated English version). 
 2007: Tilslørt. Avslørt. Et oppgjør med norsk naivisme. Kagge. 
 2008: Jeg er Mia (with Mia Gundersen). Aschehoug. 
 2009: Rundlurt. Om innvandring og islam i Norge. Kagge. 
 2015: Islam, den 11. landeplage. Kolofon. 
 2018: Islam: Europe Invaded. America Warned (English translation). Kassandra.

Awards
 Chief researcher for the documentary Rikets tilstand: Norske jenter omskjæres, which won a SKUP diploma (2000) and Gullruten (2001)
 Southern Norway's Literary Prize (2007), for her book Men størst av alt er friheten (But the Greatest of These is Freedom)

References

1962 births
Living people
People from Arendal
Norwegian School of Sport Sciences alumni
Norwegian women's volleyball players
Norwegian journalists
Norwegian women journalists
Norwegian writers
Norwegian women writers
Norwegian women's rights activists
Norwegian expatriates in Pakistan
Norwegian critics of Islam
Counter-jihad activists
Critics of multiculturalism
Anti-immigration politics in Norway
Activists against female genital mutilation
Place of birth missing (living people)